Qishn is a coastal town in Al Mahrah Governorate, seat of Qishn District in southern Yemen. It has a landing strip, which is currently not in use.

Historically, Qishn was a port from which incense was exported. The traveller and explorer Freya Stark notes that, "...from Qishn, 200 to 250 tons (of incense, annually)". The port was known to the British East India Company as Kisseen.

Today, the people of Qishn earn most of their income through fishing, farming, or the rearing of livestock.

Sources 

Populated places in Al Mahrah Governorate
Populated coastal places in Yemen